Frederick Richard Gaby (12 March 1895 – 7 April 1984) was an English hurdler who competed in the 110 metre event at the 1924 and 1928 Summer Olympics. In 1924 he was eliminated in the semi-finals, while in 1928 he finished sixth. Gaby won the bronze medal in the 120 yards hurdles at the 1930 Empire Games, aged between 41 - 45.

Gaby started as a flat sprinter, and changed to hurdles only in 1919, upon advice from his coach Sam Mussabini. He then won five out of eight international competitions and was selected for two Olympics. Domestically he won the AAA championships in 1922–23 and 1925–27; he finished second three times, last time to Lord Burghley, in 1930.

During World War I, Gaby served as an airman. After retiring from competitions in 1930 he became a shoe repairer.

References

1895 births
1984 deaths
English male hurdlers
Olympic athletes of Great Britain
Athletes (track and field) at the 1924 Summer Olympics
Athletes (track and field) at the 1928 Summer Olympics
Athletes (track and field) at the 1930 British Empire Games
Commonwealth Games bronze medallists for England
Commonwealth Games medallists in athletics
Royal Air Force personnel of World War I
People from Marylebone
People from Storrington
Medallists at the 1930 British Empire Games